Glyn Dillon (born 1971) is a British costume designer, as well as a comics and film storyboard and concept artist, best known for his work on the Star Wars films The Force Awakens and Rogue One, as well as his 2012 graphic novel The Nao of Brown.

Early life
Glyn is the youngest of 3 siblings. Glyn Dillon's father was a signwriter; his older brother Steve Dillon was also a comics artist. Julie Dillon Bleaden, the middle sibling works in childcare.

Career
Dillon got his first job in comics at the age of 17, and worked in comics for seven years, drawing "Planet Swerve", a strip about "art students in space" written by Alan Martin, for Deadline, and work for DC Comics' Vertigo imprint, including the miniseries Egypt with writer Peter Milligan and Shade, the Changing Man with the same writer. He drew part of "The Kindly Ones" story arc in Neil Gaiman's The Sandman series.

In the mid-1990s he left comics and worked in film and television, primarily as a storyboard and concept artist, as well as a period directing music promos for Ridley Scott's RSA Films. He shared a studio in London with Jamie Hewlett, and did some work on Hewlett's Gorillaz music and animation project. In 2007 a gallery of his work appeared in the comic art magazine Swallow, and he began work on his graphic novel, The Nao of Brown. The story of a young woman with Primarily Obsessional OCD, it was published by SelfMadeHero in 2012 and won the Special Jury Prize at the Angoulême International Comics Festival in 2013. In 2013 he started working as a concept artist in the costume dept on Jupiter Ascending, he then went on to work, in the same capacity, on Kingsman: The Secret Service. He then became chief concept artist in the costume dept on Star Wars: The Force Awakens, for which, among other designs, he originated antagonist Kylo Ren's mask, before being promoted to co-costume designer, alongside Dave Crossman, on the Star Wars film Rogue One and Solo: A Star Wars Story.

Bibliography
 2000 AD (Fleetway Publications, #589, 644, 1988, 1989)
 Crisis (Fleetway Publications, #32, 40-41, 43-44, 1989-1990)
 Deadline (#24, 1990,  Script by Alan Martin)
 Judge Dredd Mega-Special (Fleetway Publications, #4, 1991)
 The Sandman (DC/Vertigo, #62, 1994, script by Neil Gaiman)
 Shade the Changing Man (DC/Vertigo, #34, 38, 40-41, 46, 1994, script by Peter Milligan)
 Egypt issue 1 (pencils and inks) and issue 2 (pencils) and covers issues 1-7 (DC/Vertigo, 1995, script by Peter Milligan)
 The Nao of Brown (SelfMadeHero, 2012)

Awards
 2013: Angoulême Festival, Jury's Special Prize, for The Nao of Brown 2013: British Comic Awards, Best Book Category, for The Nao of Brown 2012: Broken Frontier Awards, Best Graphic Novel Category, for The Nao of Brown''
 2014: Treviso Comic Book Festival, Best Foreign Book Award, for "The Nao of Brown"

References

External links

Das Nao in Brown

1971 births
British graphic novelists
British comics artists
British comics writers
Living people
Designers from London